Swami Niswambalananda Girls' College, established in 1978, is an undergraduate women's college in Bhadrakali, West Bengal, India. It is affiliated with the University of Calcutta.

Departments

Arts and Commerce
Bengali
English
Sanskrit
History
Political Science
Philosophy
Economics
Commerce

Accreditation
The college is recognized by the University Grants Commission (UGC).

See also 
List of colleges affiliated to the University of Calcutta
Education in India
Education in West Bengal

References

External links
Swami Niswambalananda Girls' College

Educational institutions established in 1978
University of Calcutta affiliates
Universities and colleges in Hooghly district
Women's universities and colleges in West Bengal
1978 establishments in West Bengal